Wong You Nam (黄又南) is a Hong Kong actor.

Filmography
Just One Look (2002)
The Mummy, Aged 19 (2002)
Anna in Kungfuland (2003)
Star Runner (2003)
A.V. (2005)
Hooked on You (2007)
Linger (2008)
La Lingerie (2008)
Ip Man (2008)
Poker King (2009)
The Jade and the Pearl (2010)
Gallants (2010)
Mysterious Island (2011)
The Midnight After (2014)
Gangster Payday (2014)
An Inspector Calls (2015)
Guia in Love (2015)
Wong Ka Yan (2015)
Blue Veins (2016)
Transcendent (2018)
Goodbye UFO (2019)

Accolades
He was nominated for Best New Performer at the 22nd Hong Kong Film Awards for his work on Just One Look and Hollywood Hong Kong.

References

External links

1983 births
Hong Kong male actors
Living people